Bert Hall (1885–1948) was an American aviator and writer.

Bert Hall may also refer to:

Bert Hall (cricketer), English cricketer
Bert Hall (baseball) (1889–1948), Major League Baseball pitcher
Bert Hall (footballer, born 1880) (1880–1968), Australian rules footballer
Bert Hall (footballer, born 1882) (1882–1957), English footballer who played for Aston Villa

See also
Albert Hall (disambiguation)
Bertram Hall, Radcliffe College
Robert Hall (disambiguation)
Herbert Hall (disambiguation)